Aleksei Yevgenyevich Ivakhov (born 27 July 1976) is a Russian football manager and a former player. He is the general director for FC Yenisey Krasnoyarsk.

References

1976 births
People from Irkutsk Oblast
Living people
Russian footballers
Association football forwards
FC Yenisey Krasnoyarsk players
FC Dynamo Kirov players
Russian football managers
FC Yenisey Krasnoyarsk managers
Sportspeople from Irkutsk Oblast